Puliyangudi former constituency in the Tamil Nadu Legislative Assembly of Tamil Nadu a southern state of India. It was in Tenkasi district and it was also part of Tenkasi (Lok Sabha constituency).

Members of Legislative Assembly

Election results

1962

References

External links
 

Tenkasi district
Former assembly constituencies of Tamil Nadu